Ulolonche culea, the sheathed Quaker, is a species of cutworm or dart moth in the family Noctuidae. It is found in North America.

The MONA or Hodges number for Ulolonche culea is 10567.

References

Further reading

External links

 

Eriopygini
Articles created by Qbugbot
Moths described in 1852